Sabia conica, common name : the bonnet limpet,  is a species of small limpet-like sea snail, a marine gastropod mollusk in the family Hipponicidae, the hoof snails.

Description
The shell size varies between 7 mm and 45 mm

Distribution
This species is distributed in the Indian Ocean along Tanzania, in the Western Pacific, in the Red Sea and in the Mediterranean Sea.

References

 Spry, J.F. (1961). The sea shells of Dar es Salaam: Gastropods. Tanganyika Notes and Records 56
 Rosenberg, G. 1992. Encyclopedia of Seashells. Dorset: New York. 224 pp. page(s): 70
 Streftaris, N.; Zenetos, A.; Papathanassiou, E. (2005). Globalisation in marine ecosystems: the story of non-indigenous marine species across European seas. Oceanogr. Mar. Biol. Annu. Rev. 43: 419-453

External links
 

Hipponicidae
Gastropods described in 1817